Mandeville Films is an American film production company headquartered in Burbank, California. Founded in 1995 by film producer David Hoberman, the company re-formed as Mandeville Films and Television in 2002 after a short hiatus for three years, with Hoberman and Todd Lieberman as partners and co-owners.

History
Film executive David Hoberman founded Mandeville Films in January 1995 as he exited Walt Disney Studios with a five-year, multi-picture production deal.

In 1999, Hoberman hired Ashok Amritraj, who was an employee of Franchise Pictures, joined the company, renaming it to Hyde Park Entertainment, which will be a film financer and producer. The Hyde Park company will split deals with Walt Disney Studios and Metro-Goldwyn-Mayer.

In 2002, Amritaj and Hoberman split their ties, and Hoberman himself reformed Mandeville Films with an exclusive five-year contract with Walt Disney Studios. Hoberman brought along fellow producer Todd Lieberman as a partner, who worked with Hoberman when he was senior vice president for international finance at Hyde Park Entertainment.

When Mandeville Films returned to the studios, it was scheduled to produce 2 movies each for Touchstone and MGM: Walking Tall, Raising Helen, The Last Shot, and Beauty Shop. The studio itself went back to Disney in 2006 to co-produce Eight Below and The Shaggy Dog back-to-back.

Mandeville Films has an ongoing partnership with ABC, they renewed their contracts in July 2015, for two more years.

In May 2018, Mandeville Films ended its partnership with Disney to sign with Universal Pictures for a  "first-look production agreement".

Filmography

Feature films

1990s

2000s

2010s

2020s

Upcoming

Television series

Made for television films

References

External links
 

1995 establishments in California
1999 disestablishments in California
2002 establishments in California
Companies based in Burbank, California
Companies disestablished in 1999
Entertainment companies based in California
Entertainment companies established in 1995
Entertainment companies established in 2002
Film production companies of the United States
Re-established companies
American independent film studios